Phnom Bakheng is a Hindu and Buddhist temple in the form of a temple mountain in Siem Reap Province, Cambodia. Dedicated to Shiva, it was built at the end of the 9th century, during the reign of King Yasovarman (889-910). Located atop a hill, it is nowadays a popular tourist spot for sunset views of the much bigger temple Angkor Wat, which lies amid the jungle about 1.5 km to the southeast. The large number of visitors makes Phnom Bakheng one of the most threatened monuments of Angkor. Since 2004, World Monuments Fund has been working to conserve the temple in partnership with APSARA.

History
Constructed more than two centuries before Angkor Wat, Phnom Bakheng was in its day the principal temple of the Angkor region, historians believe. It was the architectural centerpiece of a new capital, Yasodharapura, that Yasovarman built when he moved the court from the capital Hariharalaya in the Roluos area located to the southeast.

An inscription dated 1052 AD and found at the Sdok Kak Thom temple in present-day Thailand states in Sanskrit: "When Sri Yasovardhana became king under the name of Yasovarman, the able Vamasiva continued as his guru. By the king's order, he set up a linga on Sri Yasodharagiri, a mountain equal in beauty to the king of mountains." Scholars believe that this passage refers to the consecration of the Phnom Bakheng temple approximately a century and a half earlier.

Phnom Bakheng is one of 3 hilltop temples in the Angkor region that are attributed to Yasovarman's reign. The other two are Phnom Krom to the south near the Tonle Sap lake, and Phnom Bok, northeast of the East Baray reservoir.

Surrounding the mount and temple, labor teams built an outer moat. Avenues radiated out in the four cardinal directions from the mount. A causeway ran in a northwest–southeast orientation from the old capital area to the east section of the new capital's outer moat and then, turning to an east–west orientation, connected directly to the east entrance of the temple.

Later in its history, Phnom Bakheng was converted into a Buddhist temple. A monumental Sitting Buddha, now lost, was created on its upper tier. Across its west side, a Reclining Buddha of similar scale was crafted in stone. The outlines of this figure are still visible.

Symbolism
Phnom Bakheng is a symbolic representation of Mount Meru, home of the Hindu gods, a status emphasized by the temple's location atop a steep hill 65 m above the surrounding plain. The temple is built in a pyramid form of seven levels, representing the seven heavens. At the top level, five sandstone sanctuaries, in various states of repair, stand in a quincunx pattern—one in the center and one at each corner of the level's square. Originally, 108 small towers were arrayed around the temple at ground level and on various of its tiers; most of them have collapsed.

Jean Filliozat of the Ecole Francaise, a leading western authority on Indian cosmology and astronomy, interpreted the symbolism of the temple. The temple sits on a rectangular base and rises in five levels and is crowned by five main towers. One hundred four smaller towers are distributed over the lower four levels, placed so symmetrically that only 33 can be seen from the center of any side. Thirty-three is the number of gods who dwelt on Mount Meru. Phnom Bakheng's total number of towers is also significant. The center one represents the axis of the world and the 108 smaller ones represent the four lunar phases, each with 27 days. The seven levels of the monument represent the seven heavens and each terrace contains 12 towers which represent the 12-year cycle of Jupiter. According to University of Chicago scholar Paul Wheatley, it is "an astronomical calendar in stone."

Following Angkor's rediscovery by the outside world in the mid-19th century, decades passed before archeologists grasped Phnom Bakheng's historical significance. For many years, scholars' consensus view was that the Bayon, the temple located at the center of Angkor Thom city, was the edifice to which the Sdok Kak Thom inscription referred. Later work identified the Bayon as a Buddhist site, built almost three centuries later than originally thought, in the late 12th century, and Phnom Bakheng as King Yasovarman's state temple.

Phnom Bakheng in popular media 
The view of the Angkor Wat from the top of Phnom Bakheng is featured in the movie Tomb Raider (when Lara Croft looks through the binoculars upon arriving in Cambodia).

Gallery

See also
 Angkor
 Architecture of Cambodia
 List of archaeoastronomical sites by country

Notes

References

 Goloubev, Victor. Le Phnom Bakheng et la ville de Yasovarman. Bulletin de l'EFEO (Paris), 33 (1933): 319–344.
 Goloubev, Victor. Nouvelles récherches autour de Phnom Bakhen. Bulletin de l'EFEO (Paris), 34 (1934): 576–600.

Archaeoastronomy
Hindu temples in Siem Reap Province
Angkorian sites in Siem Reap Province
9th-century Hindu temples